Roanoke is a village in Roanoke Township, Woodford County, Illinois, United States. The population was 2,065 at the 2010 census, up from 1,994 at the 2000 census. It is part of the Peoria, Illinois Metropolitan Statistical Area.

History

Early settlement
Until about 1850, much of northern Illinois was still frontier land and sparsely populated, which the exception of Chicago and towns along the rivers. This changed in 1850, when President Millard Fillmore signed a land grant for the construction of the Illinois Central Railroad (lobbied for by then-lawyers Stephen Douglas and Abraham Lincoln). With the railroad expanding into Central Illinois, new opportunities for settlement by German, Dutch, Irish, Italian, Swedish, and other European immigrants opened up in Woodford County.

Roanoke was one of these settlements. On December 17, 1872, Roanoke was mapped out and lots were offered for sale.  The plat of Roanoke was composed of 15 blocks and was bounded by Main, Front, Ann and Pleasant Streets.  Two years later in 1874, Roanoke officially became a "Village" in the State of Illinois.  Building began immediately in Roanoke and by the time the railroad was complete the population had increased to three hundred.  Henry Frantz put up the first building after the village was laid out, and John Frantz and Jacob Engle also opened pancake stores.

The first doctor in the town was Dr. John, who also served several terms as coroner.  Fauber and Hall first bought grain in Roanoke, although they never had an elevator.  They also dealt in coal.  The lumberyard was conducted by Doc Miller but soon after passed into the hands of Phillip Moore, who was one of the pioneers in business life in the vicinity.  On August 15, 1874, the first election was held for the purpose of electing six trustees for the Village of Roanoke.  To this day, the Village has continually filled those six positions.

Coal Mining
The Roanoke area, like most of Illinois, is underlain by rich veins of coal.  The second coal shaft in Woodford County was sunk in Roanoke in 1881.  Miners went down 480 feet to discover a vein of high quality coal thirty inches thick.  The longest tunnel ran about two miles east and a little north of town on a downward slope.  Another shaft started in a westerly direction, but this coal was "flinty", or mixed with rock, and digging was discontinued.  A room was dug out at the bottom of this shaft to stable the ponies and mules used before electric equipment was installed in 1905.  The drivers treated these ponies and mules with apples and candy, who were also used for farm labor during the summer months.  Blacksmith Fred Wolfe shoed the mules in the mine.  Work in the mine started at 7:00am with a blast from the mine whistle, which sounded again when the men were brought back up from mining at 3:30pm.  The mine whistle was also used to convey work delays due to weather or other events; in the evening, three whistle blasts meant the mine would be open the next day, and one blast indicated it would be closed the next day.  The mine at its peak employed around 300 men and hoisted 500 tons of  coal a day.

As was the case in most small mining towns, life in the mines could be dangerous.  In the June 29th, 1906, four men fell 400 feet down the main shaft to their deaths while performing maintenance and improvements to the main shaft. The Roanoke Call newspaper headline the following day read "ROANOKE IN MOURNING".

After the accident, the coal mine continued to operate until 1940, when it was permanently closed due to safety concerns and maintenance issues. In 1941, due to its state of disrepair, the tipple at the mine head collapsed into the shaft, leaving a crater 60 feet across and just as deep. The crater was filled in, and the remaining equipment sold as scrap.

Slate, flint, and other non-coal slag from the old mine was collected into a large mound colloquially called the "Jumbo," on the southern side of the village near where the mine was once located. Since before the mine closed, it is estimated that 800,000 tons of slag from the Jumbo has been used in various road and town improvement construction projects. Although smaller than its original size, the Jumbo  still stands at present, topped with an electric star that is illuminated during the Christmas season.

Railroad Closure
After the Roanoke mine stopped operation in 1940, and with the growing popularity of using Semi-trailer trucks to move crops from farm to market, the rail line running through Roanoke (which had been purchased by the Santa Fe Railroad some time around 1900) was eventually retired in the mid 1980s, and was promptly dismantled for scrap. The original Roanoke rail station, from which many immigrants started their lives in the village, still stands as a historical building near the corner of Main Street and Mill Street.

Agriculture
Since the earliest days of the village to present, Roanoke has been an agricultural community. Presently, its farmers are members of the cooperative Roanoke Farmers Association. The two main crops of Roanoke, like many Illinois farm towns, are corn and soy beans.

2004 tornado

While over 200 people were still inside the Parsons plant at the time, the event was notable because there were no serious injuries or fatalities, and also because numerous photos and videos were taken of it.

Geography
Roanoke is located at  (40.797421, -89.199784).

Demographics

As of the census of 2000, there were 1,994 people, 765 households, and 559 families residing in the village. The racial makeup of the village was 99.15% White, 0.10% African American, 0.10% Native American, 0.05% Asian, 0.10% from other races, and 0.50% from two or more races. Hispanic or Latino of any race were 0.15% of the population.

There were 765 households, out of which 31.5% had children under the age of 18 living with them, 64.6% were married couples living together, 6.4% had a female householder with no husband present, and 26.8% were non-families. 25.0% of all households were made up of individuals, and 14.8% had someone living alone who was 65 years of age or older. The average household size was 2.52 and the average family size was 3.00.

In the village, the population was spread out, with 24.3% under the age of 18, 7.6% from 18 to 24, 24.8% from 25 to 44, 21.4% from 45 to 64, and 21.9% who were 65 years of age or older. The median age was 40 years. For every 100 females there were 96.1 males. For every 100 females age 18 and over, there were 91.5 males.

The median income for a household in the village was $43,125, and the median income for a family was $54,750. Males had a median income of $38,375 versus $22,614 for females. The per capita income for the village was $24,489. About 2.9% of families and 4.9% of the population were below the poverty line, including 6.3% of those under age 18 and 2.5% of those age 65 or over.

Notable people
 Frank Frantz (1872-1941), Rough Rider and the final Governor of Oklahoma Territory
 Glen Gray (1900-1963), jazz saxophonist and orchestra leader, was born in Roanoke and graduated from Roanoke High School in 1917

Footnotes

External links
Village website
Roanoke-Benson School District

Villages in Woodford County, Illinois